Don Friedman at Maybeck: Maybeck Recital Hall Series Volume Thirty-Three is an album of solo performances by jazz pianist Don Friedman.

Music and recording 
The album was recorded at the Maybeck Recital Hall in Berkeley, California, in 1993. The material includes "Memories for Scotty", a Friedman original, written as a tribute to bassist Scott LaFaro.

Release and reception 

The AllMusic reviewer Ken Dryden concluded: "For those unfamiliar with Don Friedman's extensive recordings under his own name, this is a great CD to start with."

Track listing
"In Your Own Sweet Way"
"Alone Together"
"Prelude to a Kiss"
"I Hear a Rhapsody"
"Invitation"
"Memories for Scotty"
"I Concentrate on You"
"How Deep Is the Ocean?"
"Sea's Breeze"

Personnel 
 Don Friedman – piano

References 

Albums recorded at the Maybeck Recital Hall
Solo piano jazz albums